3 Bahadur: Rise of the Warriors is a Pakistani computer-animated action film directed by Sharmeen Obaid-Chinoy and written by Kamran Khan. It is the last installment in 3 Bahadur trilogy. The film stars the voices by Mehwish Hayat, Fahad Mustafa, Sarwat Gillani, Nimra Bucha and Behroze Sabzwari. It released nationwide on 14 December 2018 by ARY Films.

Cast 
 Zuhab Khan as Saadi
 Arisha Razi as Amna
 Bashar Amir Shafi as Kamil
 Mehwish Hayat as Erma
 Fahad Mustafa as Imran; Amna's father
 Sarwat Gillani as Kulsoom; Saadi's mother
 Nimra Bucha as Babushka
 Behroze Sabzwari as Deenu
 Khalid Malik as Kamil's father
 Faheem Khan as Gunchu
 Mustafa Changezi as Tony

Production 
In September 2018, ARY Films announced the production on the third animated film installment in the 3 Bahadur film series was completed, with the voices by Mehwish Hayat, Fahad Mustafa, Sarwat Gillani, Nimra Bucha, and Behroze Sabzwari, with the production done at Waadi Animations. Director Sharmeen Obaid Chinoy said in an interview to The News that the film "has some very strong female characters", featuring "a number of very strong women" from the industry, who "will change the way we see the power of women". She added that "the action sequences are stronger", and "special VFX (with effects)" have been introduced.

Writer Kamran Khan told Dawn that "The characters have grown just like their audience and the plot this time is more complex" with "twists and turns" to keep them "involved in the story". He added that they had decided if the second film does well, the franchise will be a trilogy, "if the need to revive 3 Bahadur arises in the future, who knows we might find a way". The director told that they had "special screenings" to ensure "that kids from all over Pakistan" familiarise with 3 Bahadur.

At the trailer launch, Dettol was announced as the title sponsor for the film, with Dettol Warriors also featuring in it. A golden ticket campaign was started by Dettol for the target audience of children.

Soundtrack
Title SongSingers: Asrar and Hadiqa KiyaniMusic by: Baqir Abbas and Hassan Badshah

Release 
3 Bahadur: Rise of the Warriors released on 14 December 2018 by ARY Films.

See also

 List of Pakistani animated films
 List of Pakistani films of 2018
 Nickelodeon (Pakistan)

References

External links
 
 

2010s animated superhero films
2018 action films
2018 computer-animated films
2018 films
Alien invasions in films
Films directed by Sharmeen Obaid-Chinoy
Pakistani 3D films
Pakistani action films
Pakistani animated films
Pakistani children's films
Pakistani sequel films